Alpha-D-ribose 1-methylphosphonate 5-triphosphate diphosphatase (phnM (gene)) is an enzyme with systematic name alpha-D-ribose-1-methylphosphonate-5-triphosphate diphosphohydrolase. This enzyme catalyses the following chemical reaction

 alpha-D-ribose 1-methylphosphonate 5-triphosphate + H2O  alpha-D-ribose 1-methylphosphonate 5-phosphate + diphosphate

This enzyme is isolated from the bacterium Escherichia coli.

References

External links 
 

EC 3.6.1